Tennis was one of the 28 sports that was held at the 2000 Summer Olympics in Sydney, Australia. The competition which was held from the 19-28th September at the NSW Tennis Centre, saw four gold medals being contested with them being in the singles and doubles of both genders.

The format at the 2000 Olympics was a single-elimination tournament with the men's and women's singles being 64 players. They competed in six rounds of competition in the singles and five rounds in the doubles (sizes of 32). The format consisted of three set matches with five set matches being only played in the men's singles and doubles final. 

The United States finished on top of the medal table with two gold medals as Venus Williams won both the women's singles and doubles with Serena Williams. In the men's events, Yevgeny Kafelnikov from Russia took out the men's singles title while Canadian pair, Sébastien Lareau and Daniel Nestor took out the men's doubles.

Medal summary

Medal table

Events

References
Official Olympic Report

 
2000
2000 Summer Olympics events
Olympics
2000 Olympics
Oly